de Borchgrave d'Altena is the name of a noble family from 's-Hertogenbosch and the County of Flanders.

History
According to family tradition, the ancestors of this house were Viscounts of Castle Altena. This fact is not certain, but it is worth noting that the family already claimed in the Middle Ages the coats of arms of the noble family of Altena (two averted salmons). The first Borchgraves acted as public servants of the city of Den Bosch. After the Reformation, the family moved to the Southern Netherlands.

In 1816, the family de Borchgrave d'Altena was admitted in the nobility of the United Kingdom of the Netherlands with the title of count. The Dutch branch is extinct, but the Walloon branch is still very much alive.

Famous members
Jean Guillaume Michel Pascal de Borchgrave d'Altena (1749-1818), Member of Parliament
Guillaume Georges François de Borchgrave d'Altena (1774-1845), Member of Parliament
Arnaud de Borchgrave (1926-2015), Belgian-American journalist
Camille de Borchgrave d'Altena, married American heiress Ruth Snyder, granddaughter of Charlemagne Tower
Elie de Borchgrave d'Altena, aka Elie Borgrave (1905-1992), Belgian abstract artist
Joseph de Borchgrave d'Altena (1895-1975), Belgian writer.
Isabelle de Borchgrave
Émile de Borchgrave

References

Borchgrave
Families of Belgian ancestry